The 1978 OFC U-20 Championship was a soccer tournament held in New Zealand. As in common with other biennial OFC U-20 Championships it also served as a qualification for an intercontinental play-off.  In this case the 1979 FIFA World Youth Championship.

Teams
The following teams entered the tournament:

 
 
  (host)

Matches
It is unclear why Fiji finished second in this group, with a lesser goal difference than New Zealand.

Qualification to World Youth Championship
Australia failed to qualify for the 1979 FIFA World Youth Championship. They finished last in an intercontinental play-off group with Paraguay and Israel. Matches were played in Asunción, Paraguay.

External links
Results by RSSSF

OFC U-20 Championship
Under 20
1978
OFC
OFC
1978 in youth association football